In mathematics, a norm variety is a particular type of algebraic variety V over a field F, introduced for the purposes of algebraic K-theory by Voevodsky. The idea is to relate Milnor K-theory of F to geometric objects V, having function fields F(V) that 'split' given 'symbols' (elements of Milnor K-groups).

The formulation is that p is a given prime number, different from the characteristic of F, and a symbol is the class mod p of an element

of the n-th Milnor K-group. A field extension is said to split the symbol, if its image in the K-group for that field is 0.

The conditions on a norm variety V are that V is irreducible and a non-singular complete variety. Further it should have dimension d equal to

The key condition is in terms of the d-th Newton polynomial sd, evaluated on the (algebraic) total Chern class of the tangent bundle of V. This number

should not be divisible by p2, it being known it is divisible by p.

Examples
These include (n = 2) cases of the Severi–Brauer variety and (p = 2) Pfister forms. There is an existence theorem in the general case (paper of Markus Rost cited).

References

External links
 Paper by Rost

Algebraic varieties
K-theory